This is a list of rulers of the Kel Ahaggar. Kel Ahaggar was a Tuareg territory located in present-day Algeria.

Amenokal denotes Ruler. Dates in italics indicate de facto continuation of office.

See also
Algeria
Heads of state of Algeria
Heads of government of Algeria
Colonial heads of Algeria
Tuareg
Lists of Incumbents

Sources
http://www.rulers.org/rula1.html#algeria

External links
List of Azawagh Rulers (Amenokals) - it.wiki
List of Kel Adagh Rulers (Amenokals) - it.wiki

Tuareg
History of the Sahara
Algeria history-related lists
Lists of African rulers
Lists of Berber people